Nicolás Vigneaux Poirot (born March 8, 1997 in Santiago) is an actor known by his first television series  Mujeres de lujo who played Moses. also had a cameo in the TV series Infiltradas on Chilevisión.

Later, he worked on the area's dramatic National Television of Chile on the hit television series Aquí mando yo''. and Separados.

He lived in Hollywood, California for one year.

Filmography

References

External links 
 
 

1997 births
Living people